Seynabou Mbengue (born 15 March 1992) is a Senegalese footballer who plays as a forward for French Division 2 Féminine club FF Yzeure Allier Auvergne. She has been a member of the Senegal women's national team.

Club career
Mbengue has played for Valenciennes FC and Yzeure in France.

International career
Mbengue capped for Senegal at senior level during the 2016 Africa Women Cup of Nations qualification.

References

External links

1992 births
Living people
People from Diourbel Region
Senegalese women's footballers
Women's association football forwards
Valenciennes FC players
Senegal women's international footballers
Senegalese expatriate footballers
Expatriate women's footballers in France
Senegalese expatriate sportspeople in France